KRZP is an FM radio station broadcasting on a frequency of 92.7 MHz and licensed to the city of Gassville, Arkansas. It is owned by High Plains Radio Network, LLC.

The station has a classic rock format and is known as "K92.7".

References

External links

RZP
Radio stations established in 2014
2014 establishments in Arkansas
Classic rock radio stations in the United States